Wicked Women is a collection of short stories by author Fay Weldon, published in the UK in 1995. The stories pursue the themes of relationships, family and love, with the humor and wit that is typical of Weldon's style. The book won the PEN/Macmillan Silver Pen Award in 1996.

Stories 
Weldon populates her stories with people suffering from detachment, unequal power relations, and social irreverence. Considered a strong feminist writer, Weldon usually focuses on women navigating the dangers and difficulties of marriage and domesticity, as she does in Wicked Women as well, but in this book she find everyone wicked: Men, women, children, therapists, and even supernatural beings.

The stories are divided by subject, as follows:

 Tales of Wicked Women
 End of the Line
 Run and Ask Daddy If He Has Any More Money
 In the Great War (II)
 Not Even a Blood Relation
 Tales of Wicked Men
 Wasted Lives
 Love Amongst the Artists
 Leda and the Swan
 Tales of Wicked Children Tale of Timothy Bagshott
 Valediction
 From the Other Side
 Through a Dustbin, Darkly
 A Good Sound Marriage
 Web Central
 Of Love, Pain and Good Cheer
 Pains
 A Question of Timing
 Red on Black
 Knock-Knock
 Going to the Therapist
 Santa Claus' New Clothes
 Baked Alaska
 The Pardoner 
 Heat Haze

 Reception 
The collection was well-received by critics. According to the Publishers Weekly review, "These 20 saucy tales prove that the worst varieties of human pretension and evil are often the most entertaining, especially in the hands of an expert vivisectionist like Weldon." The Kirkus review stated that, "Both sexes and all ages come in for some merry tweaking by this master of sexual satire--making this outing a familiar pleasure for old fans and a thoroughly satisfying introduction for newcomers." New York Times reviewer Deborah Mason writes, "Weldon's wrap-ups are eloquent and absolute. They are born of her belief in the dogged persistence of genetic bonds and in an uncompromising universe of clear rights and wrongs with their own inevitable consequences. With Wicked Women, Weldon has become one of the most cunning moral satirists of our time. In her rueful stories, justice is done -- whether we like it or not."Wicked Women'' won the PEN/Macmillan Silver Pen Award in 1996, and became a 1997 New York Times Notable Book of the Year.

 Publication History 
 Hardcover
 HarperCollings / Flamingo, London 1995; 
 Publisher Grove Press / Atlantic Monthly Press, New York 1997; 

 Paperback
 Flamingo / HarperCollins, London 1996; 
 Atlantic Monthly Press, New York 1999; 
 Avalon Travel Publishing, Chicago 1999; 
 Flamingo / HarperCollins, London 2008; 

 Audio book

 HarperColling (Audio cassettes), London 1995; E-book'''

 Open Road Media, April 16, 2013;

References 

British short story collections
1995 short story collections
Feminist short stories